Thomas Frei (born 17 April 1980) is a retired Swiss biathlete.

References

External links
Profile on biathlonworld.com
Statistics

1980 births
Living people
Swiss male biathletes
Biathletes at the 2010 Winter Olympics
Olympic biathletes of Switzerland